Forget the Drums (Spanish: Olvida los tambores) is a 1975 Spanish comedy film directed by Rafael Gil and starring Julián Mateos, Maribel Martín and .

Cast
Julián Mateos
Maribel Martín

Jaime Blanch 

Verónica Llimerá
José Antonio Ferrer
Antonio del Real
Abel Vitón
 as Nacho
Cristina Galbó as Pili

References

External links

1975 comedy films
Spanish comedy films
Films directed by Rafael Gil
Films scored by Gregorio García Segura
1970s Spanish-language films
1970s Spanish films